State University of Gorontalo (UNG) is a state university in Gorontalo, Indonesia, that was established on 1 September 1963. At first the university was a junior college and part of Guidance and Counseling UNSULUTENG (Sulawesi Tengah). In 1964 its status changed to Guidance and Counseling Branch IKIP Yogyakarta at Manado. In 1965 it joined the Teachers Training College branch in Manado Gorontalo.

In 1982 the institution became one of the faculties of the Sam Ratulangi University Manado with the name of the Faculty of Teacher Training and Education (Guidance and Counseling) UNSRAT Manado, Gorontalo. The institute was officially established in 1993 under the name College of Teacher Training and Education (STKIP) Gorontalo.

In 2001 the institution was upgraded to State Teachers Training College Gorontalo with five faculties and 25 study programs. On June 23, 2004, President Megawati inaugurated the State University of Gorontalo.

Faculties
The university has tenth faculties and one school:
 Faculty of Education
 Faculty of Social Sciences
 Faculty of Mathematics and Natural Sciences
 Faculty of Literature and Culture
 Faculty of Engineering
 Faculty of Agriculture
 Faculty of Fishery and Marine Science
 Faculty of Health Sciences and Sports
 Faculty of Economics and Business
 Faculty of Law
 Graduate School

References

External links
 University website Official Facebook Account

Gorontalo (city)
Universities in Gorontalo (province)
Universities in Indonesia
Indonesian state universities